Joy of Cookin' is an album by American jazz flautist Joe Thomas recorded in 1972 and released on the Groove Merchant label.

Reception 

Allmusic's Jason Ankeny said: "While not reaching the same heights of Joe Thomas' previous Ebony Godfather LP, the aptly titled Joy of Cookin' boasts a comparable deep-fried funk flavor, fusing the style and sensibility of blaxploitation-era soundtracks with the formal ingenuity of jazz. Horace Ott's big, bold arrangements nicely complement Thomas' sweet, fluttery flute, which navigates in and out of the melodies with the grace of a monarch butterfly".

Track listing
All compositions by Joe Thomas except where noted
 "Joyful, Joyful" (Joe Thomas, Horace Ott) − 4:20
 "Down Home" (Horace Ott) − 4:37
 "Chile Con Carmen" − 4:45
 "Thank You (Fall Etin Me Be Mice Elf Agin)" (Sly Stone) − 3:32
 "Soul Sermon" − 4:05
 "Mike" − 5:06
 "Dr. Ritota" − 4:40

Personnel
Joe Thomas – flute
Horace Ott − arranger, conductor (tracks 1-3)
Ernest Royal – trumpet (tracks 1-3)
Garnett Brown − trombone (tracks 1-3)
Seldon Powell – tenor saxophone (tracks 1-3)
Arthur F. Clarke (tracks 1-3), Billy Phipps (tracks 6 & 7), Robbie Porter (tracks 4-7) – baritone saxophone
Jiggs Chase − organ
Jimmy Ponder (tracks 4-7), David A. Spinozza (tracks 1-3) – guitar
Gordon H. Edwards – bass (tracks 1-3)
Bill LaVorgna (tracks 1-3), Kenny Pollard (tracks 4-7) – drums
Gordon Powell − congas (tracks 1-3)

References

Groove Merchant albums
Joe Thomas (flautist) albums
1972 albums
Albums produced by Sonny Lester
Albums arranged by Horace Ott
Albums conducted by Horace Ott